Pili pseudoannulati  is an anomaly of human hair that mimics pili annulati; however, the two differ in that the light bands of pili annulati are caused by internal effects, whereas the bright segments of pili pseudoannulati are caused by reflection and refraction of light by flattened, twisted surfaces of hair.

References

Conditions of the skin appendages